In late 1925, the Iowa State Highway Commission, now known as the Iowa Department of Transportation, announced plans to renumber several state highways.  The changes to the highway system were a result of the creation of the United States Numbered Highway System.  The new U.S. Highways replaced several of the state's primary roads and other routes were renumbered in order to eliminate driver confusion between the two systems.  As the new highways were being signed, Iowa's state highways were given a new circular route marker.  Previously, the primary road number was stenciled in black onto a telegraph pole over a band of yellow paint.

Background

In the early days of the automobile, when people still traveled cross-country predominantly by train, auto clubs were created to promote traveling by automobile.  These auto clubs would collect dues from cities and in return, they would create an auto trail, such as the Lincoln Highway and Jefferson Highway, and route traffic through those cities.  The clubs would then mark the route by painting telegraph poles with the colors and logos of their association.  Often, the trails were not the most direct ways to travel between places and as a result, competing auto clubs would spring up to divert traffic from other routes.  More often than not, the auto clubs were more interested in collecting dues than improving the roads upon which their trails lay.

Starting in 1920, the Iowa State Highway Commission began marking these auto trails with primary road numbers in order to facilitate wayfinding.  This was brought on by the success of a 1917 state law passed in neighboring Wisconsin that created a  numbered state highway system complete with route markers to replace the informal trail system.  In Iowa, however, the route numbers did not replace the trail system; they were applied in addition to the trail names; e.g. the Primary Road No. 6 number was applied to the Lincoln Highway.  Route numbers were selected in such a way that they corresponded to route numbers that were used in neighboring states.  All towns with populations over 1000 residents were connected to the primary road system.  Routes were signified on telegraph poles by a painted yellow stripe upon which the outline of Iowa with "Primary Road" and the route number were stenciled in black.

By 1924, the state highway commissioned had registered 64 named auto trails.  Each of these auto trails were sponsored by dues-collecting associations that produced maps and other promotional materials for their routes.  Confusion for the traveler reigned supreme.  Nationally, the Bureau of Public Road Engineers, with approval from the American Association of State Highway Officials, began to create a national system of interstate highways.  Their original plan was for a system covering ,  of which were to be in Iowa.  Several routes in the state would be renumbered to comply with the new interstate system; No. 6 along the Lincoln Highway would change to U.S. Highway 30.  Route renumbering had a cascading effect as the state highway commission had a policy of reducing confusion by not duplicating route numbers.  Since No. 30 was in use in northwest Iowa, that road was renumbered Iowa Highway 140.

The highway commission had planned for route markers to be changed over to the new route numbers by July 1, 1926, however, this was not the case.  In Davenport, for instance, signs for the new U.S. Highways were installed in October 1926.  Property owners thought the new signs were gaudy and did a disservice to the beauty of their streetscapes.  Complains were lodged to local auto clubs, but since this was a state project, the auto clubs deflected any responsibility.

While the efficiency of wayfinding was greatly improved by the addition of route numbers, motor club officials wished for the names of their highways to not be forgotten.  Charles M. Hayes of the Chicago Motor Club urged people to use a hybrid system of route numbers and names in order to preserve the historical significance and sentimental value of the routes.  Hayes liked the removal of trail names to railroad engineers numbering train routes while the public calls the routes by their names.  Hayes got his wish as the automobile associations disbanded, motorists continued to refer to the routes with their trail names.

New routes

Former primary roads

Route changes
This table represents sections of routes that were eliminated or reassigned to or from another route in the primary highway system.
{|class="wikitable sortable plainrowheaders"
!scope="col" rowspan=2 | Number
!colspan=2 class=unsortable|Change in length
!scope="col" class="unsortable" rowspan=2 | Southern or western terminus
!scope="col" class="unsortable" rowspan=2 | Northern or eastern terminus
!scope="col" rowspan=2 | Formed
!scope="col" rowspan=2 | Removed
!scope="col" class="unsortable" rowspan=2 | Notes
|-
!scope="col" data-sort-type="number" | mi
!scope="col" data-sort-type="number" | km
|-

Notes

References

 
 
Iowa transportation-related lists
Highway renumbering in the United States
1926 in transport
1926 in Iowa